The first season of the FX legal drama series Damages premiered on July 24, 2007 and concluded on October 23, 2007. It consisted of thirteen episodes. Damages was created by brothers Todd and Glenn Kessler along with Daniel Zelman, each of whom served as executive producers and contributed seven scripts for the season, including the premiere and the finale.

Most of the season follows two different timelines. The primary timeline begins with Ellen Parsons' (Rose Byrne) recruitment by Patty Hewes (Glenn Close) to "Hewes & Associates" and follows proceedings of a class action lawsuit against Arthur Frobisher (Ted Danson) by his former employees, whom Patty represents. The initial episodes follow Patty's attempts to capture potential witness Gregory Malina (Peter Facinelli) through Katie Connor (Anastasia Griffith). The arc further details Malina's involvement with Frobisher's lawyer Ray Fiske (Željko Ivanek) and the pressure Patty brings to bear on Fiske on Malina's subsequent death.

The narrative includes multiple flashforwards of the other timeline, set approximately six months after Ellen's appointment, until both timelines converge in the penultimate episode of the season. The alternative timeline details the attack on Ellen, her arrest for the murder of her fiancé David Connor (Noah Bean), and the subsequent murder investigation.

Cast and characters

Main cast 
Glenn Close as Patty Hewes (13 episodes)
Rose Byrne as Ellen Parsons (13 episodes)
Željko Ivanek as Ray Fiske (13 episodes)
Noah Bean as David Connor (12 episodes)
Tate Donovan as Thomas Shayes (13 episodes)
Ted Danson as Arthur Frobisher (12 episodes)

Recurring cast

Episodes

Reception

Awards and nominations 
For its first season, Damages was nominated for Outstanding Drama Series at the 2008 Primetime Emmy Awards, along with six other nominations. Co-creators Todd A. Kessler, Glenn Kessler, and Daniel Zelman were nominated for writing and Allen Coulter for directing the pilot episode ("Get Me a Lawyer"). Glenn Close received a nomination for Outstanding Lead Actress in a Drama Series, with co-stars Ted Danson and Željko Ivanek nominated for Outstanding Supporting Actor in a Drama Series. Close and Ivanek won in their respective categories, with the series also receiving a Creative Arts Emmy for Outstanding Casting for a Drama Series. The series earned four nominations at the 65th Golden Globe Awards, including Best Television Series – Drama, Close for Best Actress, and Rose Byrne and Ted Danson for their supporting roles. Close won the award in her category.

Critical reviews 
The first season of Damages was met with mostly high praise, and it earned 75 out of 100 based on 27 reviews on the aggregate review website Metacritic. This qualifies as "generally favorable reviews". On Rotten Tomatoes, the season has an approval rating of 83% with an average score of 8 out of 10 based on 24 reviews. The website's critical consensus reads, "Damages injects a high dosage of quality storytelling into a familiar genre with terrific performances and some amusing psychological unrest."

Ratings 
The series premiere on July 24, 2007 drew 3.7 million viewers, with total of 5.1 million viewers including re-airing on the same night, becoming the most watched cable television program for the night. However, the viewership declined over the first season, partially due to the story's serialized approach, with the season finale drawing 1.4 million viewers.

References

External links 
 

2007 American television seasons
season 1